Cantarutti is a surname. Notable people with the surname include:

Luca Azzano Cantarutti (born 1963), Venetian politician and lawyer
Robby Cantarutti (born 1966), Italian architect and industrial designer

Italian-language surnames